George and Leo is an American sitcom television series starring Bob Newhart and Judd Hirsch that aired on CBS from September 15, 1997 to March 16, 1998.

Synopsis
Newhart and Hirsch starred as the respective title characters, widely divergent men who become in-laws when their children get married. George's (Newhart) son was played by Jason Bateman. Bess Meyer initially played Leo's (Hirsch) daughter, but was replaced after the first eight episodes by Robyn Lively. The series was set on Martha's Vineyard, where George owned a bookstore.

One episode, "The Cameo Show", featured guest appearances from many of the costars of Newhart's and Hirsch's previous sitcoms: The Bob Newhart Show, Taxi, Newhart, and Dear John. The series was cancelled after 22 episodes due to low ratings.

Cast
 Bob Newhart as George Stoody
 Judd Hirsch as Leo Wagonman
 Jason Bateman as Ted Stoody
 Bess Meyer as Casey Wagonman (Episodes 1–7)
 Robyn Lively as Casey Wagonman (Episodes 9–22)
 Jason Beghe as Ron
 Darryl Theirse as Ambrose

Guest stars
 Veronica Cartwright     as     Grace
 Dave Coulier            as     Father Rick
 Timothy Fall            as    Jerry
 Judy Geeson             as     Louise 
 Alexondra Lee           as     Brian  
 Dinah Manoff            as     Vicki 
 Julia Sweeney           as     Julia
 Dick Martin             as     Mr. Roberson 
 Paul Willson            as     Michael
 Nora Dunn               as     Debi

Episodes

External links

1997 American television series debuts
1998 American television series endings
1990s American sitcoms
English-language television shows
CBS original programming
Television duos
Television series by CBS Studios
Television shows set in Massachusetts